Sebastiania obtusifolia is a species of flowering plant in the family Euphorbiaceae. It was described in 1912. It is native to Peru.

References

Plants described in 1912
Flora of Peru
obtusifolia